André Schmitz (17 August 1929 – 15 January 2016) was a Belgian poet.

He stayed in Central Africa, Lebanon, Quebec, and India.

Awards
In 1987, he won the A. and J. Goffin Prize Foundation for all of his culminated work, and 2000 he received the Mallarmé prize for Incises incisions.

He also received the French Community of Belgium quinquennial prize of literature for (culmination of work), and Tristan Tzara prize for scraping wings.

Works
For the Love of Fire, the Artists, 1961
Double Voice and attached, editions of Aquarius, 1965
Soleils rauques, Andre de Rache, Brussels 1973 (triennial prize for Literature, Brussels 1975)

   (Tristan Tzara prize, Paris 1991)
Scraping wing, The Tree lyrics (Amay), Phi (Luxembourg), The Writings of ironworks (Quebec), 1994
  (Academy Award Mallarme 2000)
A little rain between the teeth, poems, Protis-L'Arbre to Words, 2000
In the prose of days, Anthology 1961 - 2001, Introduction - Study Dobzynski Charles, La Renaissance du livre, 2001

References

External links
 "poet André Schmitz, article and biography of the author
 extract text and bibliography

1929 births
2016 deaths
Belgian male poets